Kickin' It at the Barn is the 14th studio album by the American rock band Little Feat, released in 2003 (see 2003 in music). The album's name came from its recording at guitarist Fred Tackett's barn in Topanga Canyon. Tackett made his debut as a lead vocalist on this album with his own song In A Town Like This, fifteen years after he joined the group. The song also served as the title track of Tackett's solo debut, released the same year.

Track listing
"Night on the Town" (Barrère, Tackett) – 6:08
"Heaven Forsaken" (Barrère, Tackett) – 4:32
"I'd Be Lyin'" (Creamer, Mariani, Murphy) – 5:56
"Corazones y Sombras" (Barrère, Bruton, Donnelly, Payne) – 8:04
"Walking as Two" (Barrère, Murphy, Payne, Tackett) – 6:23
"In a Town Like This" (Tackett) – 4:15
"Fighting the Mosquito Wars" (Payne) – 6:43
"Stomp" (Payne) – 8:56
"Why Don't It Look Like the Way That It Talk" (Barrère, Tackett) – 7:44
"I Do What the Telephone Tells Me to Do" (Barrère, Payne, Tackett) – 7:42
"Bill's River Blues" (Barrère, Payne) – 5:04

Personnel
Little Feat:
Paul Barrère - vocals, acoustic & electric guitars, dobro
Sam Clayton - percussion, vocals
Kenny Gradney - bass
Richie Hayward - drums, backing vocals
Shaun Murphy - vocals, hand percussion
Bill Payne - vocals, keyboards
Fred Tackett - vocals, electric guitar, dobro, mandolin, mandocello, trumpet

Additional personnel:
Larry Campbell - violin
Nacho Hernandez - accordion
Jesus "Chuy" Guzman - trumpet, mellophone
Piero Mariani - percussion

References 

2003 albums
Little Feat albums
Albums produced by Bill Payne